H. polyclada may refer to:

 Hatschbachiella polyclada, a South American daisy
 Hibbertia polyclada, a Guinea flower